Common Ground is a studio album by American jazz vibraphonist Gary Burton. The album was recorded by his ‘new quartet’ consisting of guitarist Julian Lage, bassist Scott Colley and drummer Antonio Sanchez. Common Ground was released on 4 July 2011 via the Mack Avenue label.

Reception 
Ken Dryden of Allmusic stated "Common Ground stands alongside the many landmark albums in Gary Burton's vast discography." Ray Comiskey of The Irish Times noted "Playing more or less unfashionably straight ahead, vibist Gary Burton’s new quartet ... has a rare chemistry."

Track listing

Personnel 
Band
 Gary Burton – vibraphone, producer
 Scott Colley – bass
 Antonio Sanchez – drums
 Julian Lage – guitar

Production
 Pete Karam – engineer
 Kevin Gray – mastering

References

External links 

Gary Burton albums
2011 albums